Henrika Šantel (17 August 1874 – 15 February 1940) was a Slovenian realist painter.

Šantel was born in Gorizia (in northeast Italy, currently on the border with Slovenia), then part of Austria-Hungary. Her mother, Avgusta Šantel, was a painter and provided initial education for Henrika at home. Her sister, Avgusta Šantel Jr., was a painter as well. In 1891, Henrika moved to Munich to study at the women's art academy (Damenacademie) with Friedrich Fehr and Ludwig Schmid-Reutte. She subsequently returned to Gorizia and taught art. After World War I, Gorizia was transferred to Italy, and Šantel with the whole family moved to Maribor, which was in Yugoslavia. In 1929, she moved to Ljubljana, where she stayed until her death.

References

1874 births
1940 deaths
19th-century Slovenian painters
20th-century Slovenian painters
20th-century women artists
19th-century women artists
Slovenian women artists